Adrian Brunker (born 23 September 1970) is an Australian former professional rugby league footballer who played in the 1990s.

Playing career
Brunker made his first grade debut for Newcastle in round 4 1990 against Penrith in a 6-6 draw.  Brunker went on to play for Newcastle in the club's first finals appearance in 1992.

In 1994, Brunker joined the Gold Coast and spent 2 years at the club as they finished near the bottom of the table in both seasons.

In 1996, Brunker joined St George and played in the 1996 ARL Grand Final against Manly-Warringah which St George lost 20-8.  Brunker played in St. George's final game before they formed a joint venture with the Illawarra Steelers to become St. George Illawarra.  A semi-final loss to Canterbury-Bankstown at Kogarah Oval.

In 1999, Brunker joined English side Wakefield Trinity and played one season with them before retiring.

References

External links
Statistics at rugbyleagueproject.org

1970 births
Australian rugby league players
Gold Coast Chargers players
Living people
Newcastle Knights players
Place of birth missing (living people)
Queensland Rugby League State of Origin players
Rugby league centres
Rugby league five-eighths
Rugby league fullbacks
Rugby league wingers
St. George Dragons players
Wakefield Trinity players